Big Sky Motion Pictures was founded in Los Angeles as a film production company by C.E.O. Mars Callahan and executive producer Rand Chortkoff. 

Their last completed film in 2007, What Love Is, starred major Hollywood actors Cuba Gooding, Jr. and Matthew Lillard. It was released to only 42 cinemas, played for one week, and grossed $18,901.

In 2008, Big Sky Motion Pictures, Rand Chortkoff and Mars Callahan were ordered to desist-and-refrain from illicit selling of securities in the State of California for the movie Spring Break '83. Apparently out of investor-funds, Big Sky never finished Spring Break '83, and had some trouble paying the vendors and workers, but seem to have settled the lawsuits privately.

On January 9, 2012, a  Judgment of Permanent Injunction, Civil Penalties and Ancillary Relief in the State of California was issued against 'Defendants Big Sky Motion Pictures, L.L.C., Spring Break ’83 Production, L.L.C., Spring Break ’83 Distribution, L.L.C., Spring Break ’83, Rand Jay Chortkoff ...  permanently enjoined from engaging in, committing, aiding and abetting, or performing directly or indirectly, by any means whatsoever, from (1) violating Corporation Code Section 25401 - offering for sale of securities by means of written or oral communications which includes any untrue statements of material fact or fails to state material facts (2) Corporation Code 25110 – offering to sell offering the sale of securities unless such security or transaction is qualified or exempted qualification (3) violating the Desist and Refrain Order issued by the Commissioner by offering and selling unqualified, non-exempt securities (4) destroying any records for a period of (3) years.   Mr. Mars Callahan was the Chief Executive Officer, Director and owner of Big Sky Motion Pictures, L.L.C., Spring Break ’83 Production, L.L.C., Spring Break ’83 Distribution, L.L.C., Spring Break ’83, during which time this Permanent Injunction to be issued.'

In February 2014, staff from Big Sky Motion Pictures were exposed by CBS News for lying and attempting to defraud reporters who posed as potential investors. On February 20, 2014, Rand Chortkoff from Big Sky Motion Pictures, and three others, was indicted by the US Justice Department for committing securities fraud to entice investors.

In May 2014, Mars Callahan was released from the board of Gawk, who had development-rights to the film Poker Junkies, due to not disclosing the above securities fraud injunction and misuse of corporate funds.

Productions
Spring Break '83
What Love Is (2007)
Poolhall Junkies (2002)
Double Down (2001)

References

External links
 as archived October 20, 2013

Companies based in Los Angeles
Film production companies of the United States